Coronilla minima is a species of flowering plant from the family Fabaceae found in Eastern and Central Spain.

Description 

References 

minima
Flora of Spain